Leon is the name of places in the U.S. state of Wisconsin:
Leon (community), Wisconsin, an unincorporated community
Leon, Monroe County, Wisconsin, a town
Leon, Waushara County, Wisconsin, a town